Vasily II Vasilyevich (10 March 141527 March 1462), also known as Vasily the Blind (Василий Тёмный), was the Grand Prince of Moscow, whose long reign (1425–1462) was plagued by civil war. At one point, Vasily was captured and blinded by his opponents, yet eventually managed to reclaim the throne. Due to his disability, he made his son, Ivan III, his co-ruler in his late years.

First ten years of internecine struggle

Vasily II was the youngest son of Vasily I of Moscow by Sophia of Lithuania, the only daughter of Vytautas the Great, and the only son to survive his father (his elder brother Ivan died in 1417 at the age of 22). On his father's death Vasily II was proclaimed Grand Duke at the age of 10. His mother acted as a regent. His uncle, Yuri of Zvenigorod (Prince of Galich-Mersky), and his two sons, Vasily the Cross-Eyed and Dmitry Shemyaka, seized on the opportunity to advance their own claims to the throne. These claims were based on the Testament of Dmitri Donskoi, Yuri's father and Vasily II's grandfather, who had stated that if Vasily I died Yuri would succeed his appanage. However, Dmitri had written the testament when Vasily I had no children of his own, and it might be argued that this provision had been made only for the case of Vasily I's childless death. Vasily II's claim was supported by Vytautas, his maternal grandfather.

Upon Vytautas' death in 1430, Yuri went to the Golden Horde, returning with a license to take the Moscow throne. But the Khan did not support him any further, largely due to the devices of the Smolensk princeling and Moscow boyarin Ivan Vsevolzhsky. When Yuri assembled an army and attacked Moscow, Vasily II, betrayed by Vsevolzhsky, was defeated and captured by his enemies (1433). Upon being proclaimed Grand Duke of Moscow, Yuri pardoned his nephew and sent him to reign in the town of Kolomna. That proved to be a mistake, as Vasily II immediately started to plot against his uncle and gather all sort of malcontents. Feeling how insecure his throne was, Yuri resigned and then left Moscow for his northern hometown. When Vasily II returned to Moscow, he had  Vsevolzhsky blinded as a traitor.

Meanwhile, Yuri's claim was inherited by his sons who decided to continue the fight. They managed to defeat Vasily II, who had to seek refuge in the Golden Horde. After  Yuri died in 1434, Vasili the Cross-Eyed entered the Kremlin and was proclaimed new Grand Duke. Dmitry Shemyaka, who had his own plans for the throne, quarreled with his brother and concluded an alliance with Vasily II. Together they managed to banish Vasily the Cross-Eyed from the Kremlin in 1435. The latter was captured and blinded, which effectively removed him from the contest for the throne.

Kazan and Shemyaka
During Vasily II 's reign the Golden Horde collapsed and broke up into smaller Khanates. Now that his throne was relatively secure, he had to deal with the Tatar threat. In 1439, Vasily II had to flee the capital, when it was besieged by Ulugh Muhammad, ruler of the nascent Kazan Khanate. Six years later, he personally led his troops against Ulugh Muhammad, but was defeated and taken prisoner. The Russians were forced to gather an enormous ransom for their prince, so that Vasily II could be released some five months later.

During that time, the control of Moscow passed to Dmitry Shemyaka. Keeping in mind the fate of his own brother, Dmitry had Vasily II blinded and exiled him to Uglich, in 1446; hence, Vasily II's nickname, 'the blind' (Tyomniy, literally 'dark'). As Vasily II still had a number of supporters in Moscow, Dmitry recalled him from exile and gave him Vologda as an appanage. That proved to be a mistake, as Vasily II quickly assembled his supporters and regained the throne.

Vasily II's final victory against his cousin came in the 1450s, when he captured Galich-Mersky and poisoned Dmitry. The latter's children managed to escape to Lithuania. These events finally put to rest the principle of collateral succession, which was a major cause of medieval internecine struggles.

Later reign and policies
Now that the war was over, Vasily II eliminated almost all of the small appanages in Moscow principality, so as to strengthen his sovereign authority. His military campaigns of 1441–60 increased Moscow's hold over Suzdal, the Vyatka lands, and the republican governments of Novgorod and Pskov.

In the meantime, Constantinople fell to the Turks, and the Patriarch agreed to acknowledge the supremacy of the Pope in the Council of Florence. Vasily II promptly rejected this arrangement. By his order in 1448, bishop Jonah was appointed metropolitan of Russia, which was tantamount to declaration of independence of the Russian Orthodox Church from the Patriarch of Constantinople. This move further strengthened Russia's reputation among Orthodox states.

In his later years the blind prince was greatly helped by Metropolitan Jonah, boyars, and then by his older son Ivan III who was styled co-ruler since the late 1450s. On Vasily II's death in 1462 Ivan III succeeded him as Grand Prince of Moscow. Vasily's daughter Anna was married to a prince of Ryazan.

See also
 Bibliography of Russian history (1223–1613)
Rulers of Russia family tree

External links
History of the Great Feudal War

1415 births
1462 deaths
15th-century Grand Princes of Moscow
Blind royalty and nobility
Grand Princes of Moscow
Russian blind people
Rurik dynasty
Medieval child monarchs
Blind politicians
Eastern Orthodox monarchs
Russian people of Lithuanian descent